Argentina participated at the 2007 Pan American Games in Rio de Janeiro, Brazil. The Argentine delegation counted a total number of 441 athletes. Argentina competed in all events, except for baseball and diving. The delegation's main bet was the Field hockey women's team, Las Leonas, led by Luciana Aymar, who carried the Argentine flag at the opening ceremony.

Medalists

Results by event

Basketball

Men's Team Competition 
Preliminary Round (Group B)
Defeated Panama (76-71)
Defeated Uruguay (71-69)
Lost to United States (71-74)
Semi Finals
Lost to Puerto Rico (80-89)
Bronze Medal Match
Lost to Uruguay (93-99) → Fourth place
Team Roster
Facundo Sucatzky
Diego García
Gabriel Mikulas
Diego Logrippo
Luis Cequeira
Matías Sandes
Román González
Martin Leiva
Patricio Prato
Javier Bulfoni
Leonardo Mainoldi
Mariano Byro
Head coach: Gonzalo García

Women's Team Competition 
Preliminary Round (Group B)
Lost to Cuba (79-81)
Lost to United States (54-85)
Lost to Colombia (66-68)
Classification Matches
5th/8th place: Defeated Jamaica (73-61)
5th/6th place: Lost to Colombia (58-59) → Sixth place
Team Roster
Constanza Landra
Marina Cava
Paula Gatti
Marcela Paoletta
Celeste Cabañez
Florencia Fernández
Alejandra Fernández
Anastasia Sáenz
Sandra Pavón
Laura Nicolini
Valentina Maggi
Alejandra Chesta

Tennis

Men's singles 
Juan Martin Aranguren
First Round — Bye
Second Round — Defeated Federico Sansonetti (URU), 6-3 6-1
Third Round — Defeated Carlos Salamanca (COL), 7-5 6-1
Quarterfinals — Lost to Flávio Saretta (BRA), 2-6 2-6
Eduardo Schwank
First Round — Bye
Second Round — Defeated Juan Carlos Ramirez (PAR), 6-2 6-3
Third Round — Defeated Jorge Aguilar (CHI), 3-6 6-2 2-6
Quarterfinals — Defeated Marcos Daniel (BRA), 2-6 7-6(3) 7-5
Semifinals — Lost to Flávio Saretta (BRA), 6-3 5-7 0-6
Bronze Medal Match — Defeated Michael Quintero (COL), 6-4 6-0 → Bronze Medal
Horacio Zeballos
First Round — Bye
Second Round — Lost to Guillermo Hormazábal (CHI), 6-3 4-6 6-3

Men's doubles 
Eduardo Schwank and Horacio Zeballos
First Round — Bye
Second Round — Defeated Cristian Paiz and Sebastien Vidal (GUA), 6-2 6-1
Quarterfinals — Defeated Michael Quintero and Carlos Salamanca (COL), 6-2 6-4
Semifinals — Defeated Víctor Estrella and Jhonson García (DOM), 6-1 6-0
Gold Medal Match — Defeated Jorge Aguilar and Adrián García (CHI), 6-3 6-4 → Gold Medal

Triathlon

Men's Competition 
Velmar Bianco
 1:55:40.29 — 15th place
Luciano Farías
 1:57:03.47 — 21st place
Lucas Cocha
 did not finish — no ranking

Women's Competition 
Pamela Geijo
 2:04:37.89 — 16th place
Nidia Kondratavicius
 2:15:46.76 — 26th place
Paulina Abrego
 did not finish — no ranking

See also
Argentina at the 2008 Summer Olympics

External links
 Argentine Olympic Committee Website
 Rio 2007 Official website

Nations at the 2007 Pan American Games
P
2007